Prairie Heights Senior High School is a public high school located approximately 11 miles east of Lagrange, Indiana.

Demographics
The demographic breakdown of the 424 students enrolled for 2015-16 was:
Male - 53.1%
Female - 46.9%
Native American/Alaskan - 2.6%
Asian/Pacific islanders - 0.5%
Black - 0.9%
Hispanic - 2.6%
White - 91.5%
Multiracial - 1.9%
33.7% of the students were eligible for free or reduced-cost lunch. In 2015–16, this was a Title I school.

Athletics

The Prairie Heights Panthers compete in the Northeast Corner Conference. The school colors are red, white and black.  The following Indiana High School Athletic Association (IHSAA) sanctioned sports are offered:

Basketball (girls and boys)
Cross country (girls and boys)
Football (boys)
Golf (girls and boys)
Soccer (boys)
Softball (girls)
Track (girls and boys)
Volleyball (girls)
Wrestling (boys)

See also
 List of high schools in Indiana

References

External links

Buildings and structures in LaGrange County, Indiana
Public high schools in Indiana
Education in LaGrange County, Indiana